Rhodocollybia laulaha  is a species of fungus in the family Marasmiaceae. Found in Hawaii, it was described as new to science in 1999 by mycologists Dennis Desjardin, Roy Halling, and Don Hemmes. Gills have an adnexed attachment to the stipe, and are narrow and very crowded together. The specific epithet laulaha—Hawaiian for "widespread"—refers to its widespread distribution and common appearance on the Hawaiian Islands.

References

External links

Fungi of Hawaii
Fungi without expected TNC conservation status

Marasmiaceae
Rhodocollybia